Out of My Mind may refer to:

Music 
 "Out of My Mind" (Bingo Players song)
 "Out of My Mind" (B.o.B song)
 "Out of My Mind" (Duran Duran song)
 "Out of My Mind" (Johnny Tillotson song)
 "Out of My Mind" (Lasgo song)
 "Out of My Mind / Holy Water", WhoCares charity song by Ian Gillan, Tony Iommi & Friends
 "Out of My Mind", a song by Buffalo Springfield from Buffalo Springfield
 "Out of My Mind", a song by James Blunt from Back to Bedlam
 "Out of My Mind", a song by the John Mayer Trio from Try!
 "Out of My Mind", a song by Nikki Lane from All or Nothin'
 "Out of My Mind", a song by Pearl Jam, the B-side of the single "Not for You"
 "Out of My Mind", a song by Philip Sayce from Influence
 "Out of My Mind", a song by Saint Etienne from Home Counties

Television 
 "Out of My Mind" (Buffy the Vampire Slayer), a 2000 episode of Buffy the Vampire Slayer

Literature 
 Out of My Mind, a 1943 book by Katharine Brush
 Out of My Mind, a 1999 autobiography by Kristin Nelson
 Out of My Mind, a 1999 novel by Richard Bach
 Out of My Mind, a 2006 book by Andy Rooney
 Out of My Mind, a 2006 novel by Eric Staller
 Out of My Mind (Draper novel), a 2010 novel by Sharon Draper